In Montreal is an album by bassist Charlie Haden and guitarist/pianist Egberto Gismonti recorded in 1989 at the Montreal International Jazz Festival and released on the ECM label in 2001.

Reception
The Allmusic review by  David R. Adler awarded the album 3 stars, stating, "Bassist Charlie Haden has done a tremendous amount of playing in duo contexts. This live recording with the remarkable pianist/guitarist Egberto Gismonti is a fine addition to his duo resumé".

Track listing
 "Salvador" (Egberto Gismonti) - 7:36
 "Maracatú" (Egberto Gismonti) - 9:21
 "First Song" (Charlie Haden) - 6:28
 "Palhaço" (G. E. Carneiro, Egberto Gismonti) - 9:19
 "Silence" (Charlie Haden) - 9:48
 "Em Família" (Egberto Gismonti) - 10:03
 "Lôro" (Egberto Gismonti) - 7:31
 "Frevo" (Egberto Gismonti) - 6:43
 "Don Quixote" (G. E. Carneiro, Egberto Gismonti) - 12:02
Recorded at the Festival International de Jazz de Montréal on July 6, 1989

Personnel
Charlie Haden — double bass
Egberto Gismonti — guitar, piano

References 

ECM Records live albums
Charlie Haden live albums
Egberto Gismonti albums
2001 live albums
Albums produced by Manfred Eicher